, a Japanese word meaning "graduation", may refer to:

 "Sotsugyō" (Yuki Saito song), 1985
 "Sotsugyō" (Zone song), 2004
 "Sotsugyō (Mata, Aō ne)", a 2008 song by Hatsune Okumura
 "Sotsugyō", a 2006 song by Miliyah Kato
 "Sotsugyō (Graduation)", a 1985 song by Momoko Kikuchi
 Sotsugyō, a 2002 film directed by Masahiko Nagasawa